Chetopa Township is a township in Wilson County, Kansas, in the United States.

History
Chetopa Township was established in 1870. It was named for Chief Chetopa, an Osage Indian chief.

References

Townships in Wilson County, Kansas
Townships in Kansas